Borrasca is a fiction podcast written and created by Rebecca Klingel (aka CK Walker), and produced by and starring Cole Sprouse, adapted from the novella by CK Walker. It debuted on May 25, 2020, and released episodes weekly on Mondays through July 14, 2020. It is a production of the audio fiction production company QCODE. 

On March 31, 2022, it was announced that a season 2 would be released later that year. It premiered on October 6, 2022, and concluded on November 10, 2022.

Premise

Borrasca is based on a multi-part short story written by Rebecca Klingel (also known as CK Walker), which she posted to the r/nosleep community on Reddit in 2015. "Borrasca" won the subreddit's award for Scariest Story in 2015. After the story went viral, Mike Flanagan recruited Klingel to write for the Netflix show The Haunting of Hill House.

Cast and characters 
 Cole Sprouse as Sam Walker
 Charlie Shotwell as Young Sam Walker
 Daniel Webber as Kyle Landy
 Zackary Arthur as Young Kyle Landy
 Sarah Yarkin as Kimber Destaro
 Lulu Wilson as Young Kimber Destaro
 Lisa Edelstein as Leah Dixon
 Peyton Kennedy as Whitney Walker
 Jama Williamson as Lisbeth Walker
 Mark Derwin as Graham Walker
 Dan Blank as Ken Landy
 Carmen Tonarelli as Anne Landy
 Carolyn P. Riggs as Megan Destaro
 Roger Howarth as Peter Destaro
 Caroline Newton as Krista Portnick and Lily Walstein
 Aidan McGraw as Young Parker Landy and Wes Litszick
 Beau Knapp as Erik Tucker
 Richard Burgi as Killian Clery
 James Wellington as Mr. Diamond and Tom Prescott
 Jules Giselle as Phoebe Dranger
 Ella Anderson as Paige Berry
 Hynden Walch as Young Kristy Nanbelt and Woman #5
 Jack McGraw as Kaiden Whitiger
 Louise Lombard as Mrs. Tverdy and Woman in White
 Rebecca Field as Kathryn Scanlon
 Sean Maguire as Jimmy Prescott
 Debbe Hirata as Grace Clery
 Cara Santana as Meera Daley
 Michael Deery as Phil Saunders
 Christian Isaiah as Young Phil Saunders
 Aramis Knight as Mike Sutton
 Rhys Alterman as Young Mike Sutton
 Seychelle Gabriel as Emmaline Bonham
 Sam Jaeger as Owen Daley
 Violet McGraw as Wyatt Litzick
 Kristen Tepper as Amanda Litzick
 Mace Coronel as Parker Landy, Boyfriend, and Burnout
 Julia Henning as Kristy Nanbelt, Woman #2, and Nurse #1
 Dylan Bruno as Kevin Vanderveld
 Staysha Holcombe as Receptionist
 Carlo Rota as Pastor and Officer Jameson
 Nick Sagar as Officer Ramirez
 Gary Galone as Deputy #1
 Mara Shuster-Lefkowitz as Woman #1
 Sheila Carrasco as Nurse #2

Episodes

Season 1

Season 2

Accolades

See also 
 Horror podcast

References

External links

Audio podcasts
2020 podcast debuts
Horror podcasts
2020 podcast endings
American podcasts
American radio dramas
Scripted podcasts
Binaural podcasts